Frances Spalding  (née Crabtree, born 16 July 1950) is a British art historian, writer and a former editor of The Burlington Magazine.

Life
Frances Crabtree studied at the University of Nottingham and gained her PhD for a study of Roger Fry. She taught art history at Sheffield City Polytechnic (19781988) before becoming a freelance writer and curator. She returned to academic work to take up the post of professor of Art History at Newcastle University in 2000.

Spalding specialises in 20th-century British art, biography and cultural history and her work includes 15 major books, essays, criticism and reviews. She curated the 2003 exhibition "John Piper in the 1930s: Abstraction on the Beach" at Dulwich Picture Gallery in south London.
She has also written a study of poet Stevie Smith and a biography of John and Myfanwy Piper. When reviewing John Piper, Myfanwy Piper: Lives in Art, The Independent said of Spalding "At her scintillating best, she is both a brilliant encapsulator and shrewd summer-up; above all, an enthusiast and advocate whose wisdom makes you eager for her subject."

Spalding was elected a Fellow of the Royal Society of Literature in 1984. She was appointed as Commander of the Order of the British Empire (CBE) in the Birthday Honours 2005 for services to literature. She is a trustee of the Charleston Trust.

Spalding became the Editor of The Burlington Magazine in September 2015, leaving in August 2016.

In 1974, Crabtree married Julian Spalding; the couple divorced in 1991.

Selected publications 

 Magnificent Dreams: Burne-Jones and the Late Victorians (1978)
 Whistler (1979)
 Vanessa Bell (1979) 
 Roger Fry: Art and Life (1980)
 
 British Art since 1900 (1986)
 Stevie Smith: A Critical Biography (1988)
 20th Century Painters and Sculptors: Dictionary of British Art (1990)
 Dance Till the Stars Come Down: A Biography of John Minton (1991)
 Virginia Woolf: Paper Darts: the Illustrated Letters (ed) (1991)
 Duncan Grant: A Biography (1997)
 The Tate: A History (1998)
 Ravilious in Public: A Guide to Works by the Artist in Public Collections (2002)
 John Piper in the 1930s: Abstraction on the Beach (2003)
 Gwen Raverat: Friends, Family and Affections (2001)
 The Bloomsbury Group, National Portrait Gallery Insights (2005)
 John Piper, Myfanwy Piper: Lives in Art, Oxford University Press (2009)

Reviews

Review of:

References

1950 births
Living people
20th-century biographers
21st-century biographers
Academics of Newcastle University
Academics of Sheffield Hallam University
Alumni of the University of Nottingham
Bloomsbury Group biographers
British art curators
British women biographers
Commanders of the Order of the British Empire
English art critics
English art historians
English biographers
English magazine editors
Fellows of Clare Hall, Cambridge
Fellows of the Royal Society of Literature
Women art historians
Women magazine editors
Women biographers
British women curators